Liverpool Waters is a large scale £5.5bn development that has been proposed by the Peel Group in the Vauxhall area of Liverpool, Merseyside, England. The development will make use of a series of presently derelict dock spaces at Central Docks. From 2004 to 2021, much of the docks involved in the development were part of the Liverpool Maritime Mercantile City, a UNESCO World Heritage Site, but the development of these docks were cited as a reason for the revocation of Liverpool's World Heritage status. This is an area north of Liverpool's historic Pier Head. It is the sister programme of the Wirral Waters project. Since 2012 the two projects have enjoyed enterprise zone status, together forming the Mersey Waters Enterprise Zone.

The development
The development is planned to create at least 17,000 full-time jobs and 21m sq ft of new commercial and residential floor space including 23,000 apartments and four hotels. The tallest towers are proposed to be over 50 storeys high.

It is split into four sectors:
Sector A: Bramley-Moore Dock, Nelson Dock
Sector B: Salisbury Dock, Collingwood Dock
Sector C: Liverpool Canal Link, including Trafalgar Dock, Clarence Dock, West Waterloo Dock, East Waterloo Dock
Sector D: Prince's Half-Tide Dock, Prince's Dock

The developers have stated that the project may take 50 years before it is finished. The proposals are presently at the planning stage and are subject to public acceptance.
The planning applications were submitted by the developers on 4 October 2010. As of March 2012, Liverpool City Council has granted planning permission to the Liverpool Waters scheme as a whole. English Heritage has formally objected to the plans and UNESCO has expressed concern, placing Liverpool - Maritime Mercantile City on its List of World Heritage in Danger in 2012.
The proposal was referred to Communities Secretary Eric Pickles to assess whether to hold a public inquiry. Pickles' decision not to call a public inquiry, announced in March 2013, means that the project can go ahead regardless, although it is unclear what the next steps are or when they may be taken. In July 2021, the World Heritage Committee cited the development as a reason for the revocation of Liverpool's World Heritage status.

Transport links
A monorail to link the area to Liverpool's city centre, with the potential to connect to the John Lennon Airport has been proposed.

Loss of Liverpool's World Heritage status

Development has met with opposition from several heritage bodies, including UNESCO, who said the development could lead to Liverpool losing its World Heritage Site status. 

In July 2017, UNESCO warned that Liverpool's status as a World Heritage Site was at risk of being rescinded, partly in light of Liverpool Waters' development proposals, with English Heritage asserting that the proposals would leave the setting of some of Liverpool's most significant historic buildings "severely compromised", the archaeological remains of parts of the historic docks "at risk of destruction", and "the city's historic urban landscape ... permanently unbalanced".

In 2021, UNESCO recommended that the City lose its status, with Liverpool Waters project, the development at Bramley-Moore Dock and the longstanding development of the waterfront being cited as reasons for the recommendation.

Liverpool City Region Mayor Steve Rotheram opposed the decision and said, "We are proud of our history but our heritage is a vital part of our regeneration. I'd urge them to take up our invitation to visit rather than taking their decision sat around a table on the other side of the world." The revocation of the World Heritage Site status was confirmed in July 2021.

See also
Atlantic Gateway
Wirral Waters

References

External links
 Official site
 Liverpool North Docks views, Liverpool Pictorial
 Regenerating Liverpool’s historic docklands

Liverpool docks
Redeveloped ports and waterfronts in Merseyside
Proposed populated places in the United Kingdom
Proposed transport infrastructure in the North West of England
Proposed buildings and structures in Liverpool
Liverpool Waters
The Peel Group